Takayus quadrimaculatus is a species of comb-footed spider in the family Theridiidae. It is found in China and Korea.

References

Theridiidae
Spiders described in 1991
Spiders of Asia